Fraumeni is an Italian surname. Notable people with the surname include:

 Barbara Fraumeni (born 1949), American economist
 Joseph F. Fraumeni Jr. (born 1933), American physician and cancer researcher

See also
Giacobbe Fragomeni

Italian-language surnames